Acclaim may refer to:

 Acclamation, a form of election that does not use a ballot

Companies
 Acclaim Comics, a bankrupt publisher of comic books restarted under Valiant Entertainment 
 Acclaim Entertainment, a defunct American video game developer and publisher
 Acclaim Games, an American online video game company
 Acclaim Studios, an organization of Acclaim-owned game development studios
 Acclaim Studios Austin, an Austin, Texas-based video game company
 Acclaim Studios Manchester, a British video game company

Transportation
 Commodore Acclaim, an Australian model of automobile produced between 1993 and 1995
 Mooney M20TN Acclaim, a personal use civil aircraft
 Plymouth Acclaim, a mid-size sedan (1989–1995)
 Triumph Acclaim, a front wheel drive medium-sized family car (1981–1984)